El Dorado Canyon or Eldorado Canyon may refer to:

El Dorado Canyon (Nevada)
Eldorado Canyon State Park, Colorado
Operation El Dorado Canyon, the codename of the 1986 United States bombing of Libya